Cera Care is a digital-first healthcare-at-home company delivering care, nursing, telehealth and repeat prescription services in people’s homes via technology. Founded in 2015, the company provides elderly and vulnerable communities with care in their own homes, and allows families to arrange the care.

Performance
Its technology, very similar to that used in virtual wards, is said to have reduced hospitalisation rates by 52%, predicted up to 80% of hospitalisations 7 days in advance, reduced patient falls by 17%, reduced urinary problems by 47%, infections by 15% and helped improve medication compliance in older patients by 35%.

History

Founding and seed funding (2016-2017) 
Cera was formally launched in 2016 by its co-founders, Dr Ben Maruthappu and Marek Sacha. In November 2016, it raised £1.3m from investors including David Buttress, the former CEO of JustEat, and Peter Sands, the former CEO of Standard Chartered, the largest seed-round funding in European health tech history. In April 2017, it raised a further £1.4m in seed funding from investors including French billionaire Xavier Niel’s fund Kima Ventures.

Early development and investments (2017-2020) 
In 2018, the firm expanded to Birmingham, Leeds and Manchester, and acquired care businesses in Huddersfield and Nottingham. They invested £10 million to expand to 14 cities across the UK and roll out new technologies, and to launch a recruitment drive for the social care sector through social media.

In 2019, the firm launched its Smart Care app, which uses machine learning and data from 68,000 care records reviewed by professionals, to predict and alert carers to possible health deteriorations with 82% accuracy.

Acquisitions and expansion (2021-present) 
Cera Care acquired the domiciliary care division of Mears Group in February 2020.

In 2020, Cera built and licensed technology to the UK government to help people out of work due to the Coronavirus pandemic to get into work in care. The technology has since been rolled out as ‘Join Social Care’, and has helped 100,000 people secure a meaningful career in care.

In August 2021, Cera Care expanded into nursing services at home for people with complex conditions or long COVID-19 and planned to offer clinical training courses for existing care staff.  As of September 2021, the company had delivered 10 million care visits to its clients homes during the Coronavirus pandemic and also announced its plans to create 5,000 new jobs in the UK after early delivery of the company’s initial aim to create 10,000 jobs during the pandemic.

According to the Daily Express, Cera launched its new technology product Flu-ID, a digital flu tracker which uses AI and data analytics to reduce hospitalizations and help prevent the NHS from becoming overwhelmed during winter.

In 2022, the company made its first international expansion, to Germany. Cera operates with 50 staff across two locations in Potsdam and Berlin.

The company delivers 40,000 healthcare visits a day, which is equivalent to 50 hospitals. 

Cera is one of the Europe's fastest-growing companies: turnover rose from £45.2 million in 2020 to £133.6 million in 2021.

In 2022 it raised $320 million and plans to expand from servicing 15,000 to 100,000 at-home patients each day.  It planned to recruit 5,000 new care workers.

Partnerships and awards 
As of 2017, Cera Care claimed to have 20 partnerships with NHS organisations, councils, and public organisations, including Dementia Action Alliance. It won the Health Startup of the Year award at the British Startup Awards; the Award for Dementia Care and Rising Star at the LaingBuisson Awards; and the Digital Health Innovation of the Year award at the Global Awards. It was also included at the European Innovation Summit as one of the EU's Top 50 Startups.

In April 2018, following allegations of misleading marketing, CeraCare removed mentions of the partnerships that were not up to date from its website and investigated reviews on Facebook and Trustpilot.

At the beginning of 2019, the firm partnered with IBM to test sensors used in self-driving cars to help with monitoring of elderly people.

As of 2022, Cera holds more than 300 partnerships with the NHS and Local Authorities.

The company has most recently been awarded Home Care Insights 2021 Home Care Provider Of The Year, the second most disruptive and innovative business by Startups.co.uk and the 8th fastest growing company by Deloitte. Cera also won Scale Up Team of the Year at the UK Business Angels Association Awards in 2022.

Cera’s CEO and co-founder, Dr Ben Maruthappu, was a London & South East Finalist in the EY Entrepreneur of the Year Awards in 2021.

See also
Private healthcare in the United Kingdom

References

External links
 

British companies established in 2016
Elderly care
Health care companies of the United Kingdom
Technology companies based in London